The Copa Libertadores 1983 was won by Grêmio against C.A. Peñarol.

Qualified teams

First round
One team from each group qualified to the semi-finals.

Two points were given for a win. 
One point was given for a tie.
No points were given for a loss.
Teams in green qualified to the semi-finals.

Group 1

Group 2

Group 3

Group 4

Group 5

Tiebreak Playoff Match

Semi-finals

Group 1

Group 2

Finals

Champion

External links
RSSSF

1
Copa Libertadores seasons